Christian of Mainz may refer to:

Christian I (archbishop of Mainz), r. 1165–1183
Christian II (archbishop of Mainz), r. 1249–1251